Yvonne Mokgoro (born 19 October 1950) is a former justice of the Constitutional Court of South Africa and wife to Job Mokgoro.

Career
Mokgoro was appointed to the bench in 1994 by Nelson Mandela. Mokgoro is a board member of the Centre for Human Rights at the University of Pretoria and is the current Chairperson of the South African Law Reform Commission.

She was educated at North-West University from which she graduated with a B.luris degree in 1982, an LLB degree two years later, and an LLM in 1987. She also studied at the University of Pennsylvania Law School in the US, where she was awarded another LLM degree.

In December 2021, Mokgoro was appointed by the United Nations Human Rights Council as a chairperson of Racial Justice Body, a new mechanism to examine systemic racism and the excessive use of force against Africans and people of African descent by law enforcement worldwide. She will be one of three members along with Juan E. Méndez of Argentina and Tracie L. Keesee of the United States.

Other activities
 Open Society Justice Initiative, Member of the Board

Recognition
Among the numerous awards she was given are the Human Rights Award by the Black Lawyers Association, (1995) the Oude Molen Reserve Order of Merit (1995/1996), the Legal Profession's Woman Achiever Award by the Centre for Human Rights, the University of Pretoria (2001), University of the North School of Law Excellence Award (2003), the Kate Stoneman Democracy Award (2003), the Tshwane Outstanding Service Award (TOSA) in 2006 and the James Wilson Award by the University of Pennsylvania Law School (2008).

References

1950 births
Living people
South African women judges
Academic staff of the University of Pretoria
Academic staff of the University of the Western Cape
Judges of the Constitutional Court of South Africa
Constitutional court women judges
South African women in politics
University of Pennsylvania Law School alumni